Valentin Barišić (born 18 September 1964) is a Croatian football manager.

He was appointed manager of Lokomotiva in June 2016.

References

External links
 

1964 births
Living people
People from Požega, Croatia
Croatian football managers
NK Lučko managers
NK Zagreb managers
NK Vinogradar managers
HNK Segesta managers
NK Sesvete managers
NK Lokomotiva Zagreb managers
Croatian Football League managers